The mausoleum of Ruhollah Khomeini houses the tombs of Ayatollah Ruhollah Khomeini, his wife Khadijeh Saqafi, and his second son Ahmad Khomeini; and some political figures, such as former President Akbar Hashemi Rafsanjani, former Vice President Hassan Habibi, Lieutenant General Ali Sayad Shirazi, Iranian Revolution figure Sadeq Tabatabaei, and MP Marzieh Hadidchi. The mausoleum is located to the south of Tehran in the Behesht-e Zahra (Paradise of Zahra) cemetery. Construction commenced in 1989 following Khomeini's death on June 3 of that year. The Iranian government has reportedly devoted 2 billion US dollars to this development.

The site is a place of pilgrimage for followers of Khomeini. It is used symbolically by government figures, and is on occasion visited by foreign dignitaries. Every year, Khomeini's death anniversary is marked on 4 June at the mausoleum in a ceremony that is attended by governmental officials, foreign ambassadors, and others. Khomeini's grandson Ayatollah Seyyed Hassan Khomeini is in charge of caring for the mausoleum. The Haram-e Motahhar Metro Station is the closest metro station to the mausoleum.

Specifications
The architect of the tomb was Mohammed Tehrani.  The exterior of the shrine complex is a highly recognizable landmark. It has a gold dome sitting on a high drum, surrounded by four free-standing minarets. The shrine is surrounded by a large rectangular plaza which has been designed to hold vast numbers of visitors. With its size, inclusion of a qibla wall and a maqsura, the tomb resembles a mosque, but has been called an Hussainia. 

Inside, Khomeini's sarcophagus is centrally placed under the gilded dome. The dome sits above a transition zone with two layers of clerestories, decorated with stained glass depicting tulips (an Iranian symbol of martyrdom). The dome is supported by eight large marble columns that circle the sarcophagus, that together with other smaller columns support the space frame ceiling. The ceiling is also punctuated by clerestories. The floor and wall surfaces are made of polished white marble. The floor is covered with fine carpets.

Non-Muslims are allowed inside the complex.

Incidents
On June 20, 2009, a suicide bomb attack occurred near the site of the Mausoleum, in which the attacker was killed and three pilgrims were injured, according to state media. The attack did not damage the mausoleum.

On June 7, 2017, the mausoleum was attacked by three gunmen  while a suicide bomber detonated a bomb at the mausoleum. One female militant attacker was captured. Government officials later claimed to have thwarted a third attack. One person died and five people were injured. Others attacked the parliament building at the same time.

See also

 Behesht-e Zahra
 Ruhollah Khomeini
 Reza Shah's mausoleum
 Holiest sites in Islam (Shia)
 Imām Ridhā Mosque
 Fatimah al-Ma'sūmah Mosque
 Shāh Abdol Azīm Mosque
 History of Persian domes

Non-religious tombs
Lenin's Mausoleum, Moscow
Georgi Dimitrov Mausoleum, Sofia
Klement Gottwald Mausoleum, Prague 
National Martyrs Cemetery of Albania, Tirana 
Carol Park, Bucharest
House of Flowers, Belgrade
Türkmenbaşy Ruhy Mosque, Gypjak, Ashgabat
Mausoleum of Karimov, Samarkand 
Mausoleum of Mao Zedong, Beijing
Cihu Mausoleum, Taoyuan
Kumsusan Palace of the Sun, Pyongyang
Sükhbaatar's Mausoleum, Ulanbaatar
Astana Giribangun, Central Java
Ferdinand E. Marcos Presidential Center, Batac
Ho Chi Minh Mausoleum, Hanoi
Gamal Abdel Nasser Mosque, Cairo 
Mausoleum of Hafez al Assad, Qardaha
Mausoleum of Yasser Arafat, Ramallah
Mazar-e-Quaid, Karachi 
Bourguiba mausoleum, Monastir
Anıtkabir, Ankara 
Angel of Independence, Mexico City
Monumento a la Revolución, Mexico City
Santa Ifigenia Cemetery, Santiago de Cuba
Altar de la Patria, Santo Domingo
Cuartel de la Montaña 4F, Caracas
National Pantheon of Venezuela, Caracas
Artigas Mausoleum, Montevideo
Altar de la Patria of Chile, Santiago 
Panteón Nacional de los Héroes, Asuncion

References

External links
 Khomeini's Tomb Attracts Pilgrims
 Khomeini Tomb

Ruhollah Khomeini
Khomeini
Biographical museums in Iran
Religious buildings and structures completed in 1992
Buildings and structures in Tehran
Museums in Tehran
Religious buildings and structures in Tehran
Monuments and memorials in Iran
Tourist attractions in Tehran
Islamic Republic of Iran era architecture
1992 establishments in Iran